Adnan Patrawala was the teenage son of a businessperson from Mumbai, India. On 18 August 2007, Adnan was kidnapped for  ransom. He was murdered the next day when news of the kidnapping broke on national TV and print media.

Accused
Following are the accused and their age at the time of the incident;

4 of them were released as they were innocent.

Killing
By the time the kidnappers made a ransom call, the kidnapping made national news so Adnan's kidnappers strangled him and dumped his body in Palm Beach road, Navi Mumbai and took local trains home.

Trial & verdict
On 30 Jan 2012, Mumbai sessions court acquitted four of the five accused. The prosecution failed to prove its case. Aslam Patrawala (father) said that he would appeal in a higher court. Being a juvenile, the fifth accused was tried by the Juvenile Justice Board.

See also
List of kidnappings
List of solved missing person cases
List of unsolved murders
Murder of Snehal Gaware

References

2000s missing person cases
2007 murders in India
Children's rights
Deaths by beating
Formerly missing people
Indian case law
Indian murder victims
Kidnappings in India
Male murder victims
Missing person cases in India
Murder in India
Murder in Mumbai
Trials in India
Unsolved murders in India
People murdered in Mumbai